USS Simpson (DD-221/APD-27/AG-97) was a Clemson-class destroyer in the United States Navy during World War II. She was the first ship named for Rear Admiral Edward Simpson.

Simpson was laid down on 9 October 1919 by William Cramp & Sons; launched on 28 April 1920; sponsored by Miss Caroline Sterett Simpson, daughter of Rear Admiral Simpson; and commissioned on 3 November 1920.

Service history
Simpson conducted training exercises with the Pacific Fleet during her first year of service, including a cruise to Valparaíso, Chile. She then transited the Panama Canal on 12 December 1921, and after overhaul at Philadelphia, she sailed from Newport, Rhode Island, for the Mediterranean on 6 June 1922. Between 29 June 1922 and 26 February 1924, Simpson served as a unit of the United States Naval Detachment in Turkish waters under Rear Admiral Mark L. Bristol, protecting American interests during the unrest in the Near East following World War I. Simpson was involved in protecting United States citizens, and aiding the work of the American Relief Association in the Black Sea and rescued mainly hundreds of Americans after the great fire of Smyrna on 13 September 1922. After a tour of ports in the western Mediterranean and the English Channel, Simpson departed Southampton, England, on 1 July 1924 for overhaul at Norfolk, Virginia. She then underwent training in the Caribbean and on the United States West Coast before crossing the Pacific for duty with the Asiatic Fleet.

Upon arrival at Chefoo, China, on 14 June 1925, Simpson entered the routine of the Asiatic Fleet, training at bases in Tsingtao and Chefoo in the summer and Manila in the winter, and visiting Chinese ports during the transit each way. During 1925, unrest in China increased, due to the growth in strength of the Kuomintang forces under Chiang Kai-shek and anti-foreign outbreaks at Shanghai and Canton. Destroyers were detached from the fleet to supplement the normal gunboat patrols on the Yangtze River and along the southern coast of China near Canton. Simpson rescued some missionaries at Deep Bay, China, on 2 and 3 July 1925, and during the next several years, carried out numerous patrols in Chinese waters protecting American lives and property. The destroyer was stationed at Nanking when Japan launched an air and sea attack on Shanghai at the end of January 1932, and she supported American diplomats in the southern Chinese capital during the critical early days of the crisis, as well as sending important reports to Washington. On 11 February, she moved to Shanghai and, on 23 February, to Swatow, where she remained until 2 April 1932. On 18 April, Simpson departed Manila with her squadron to return to the United States.

After overhaul at Mare Island, Simpson joined Destroyers, Battle Force, at San Diego, California on 28 September 1932 and conducted fleet exercises and training along the U.S. West Coast during the next several years. She then resumed training with the Pacific Fleet and participated in fleet maneuvers ("problems") annually in 1936, 1937, and 1938.

On 6 March 1939, Simpson transited the Panama Canal to the Atlantic, and between 5 June and 30 August 1939, she carried out three training cruises for Naval Academy midshipmen. She then commenced training cruises for Naval Reservists, but at the outbreak of war in Europe, she was assigned Neutrality Patrol duty and sailed for the Caribbean on 6 September. There she carried out patrols and participated in exercises, including a fleet landing exercise at Culebra from 14 February to 10 March 1940. After one training cruise for midshipmen and one for reservists during the summer, she resumed Neutrality Patrol duties in the Caribbean in October.

World War II
Simpson was part of a support force formed on 18 March 1941, after the signature of the Lend-Lease Act, to protect convoys between America and Britain in the North Atlantic. After several months of coastal escort and patrol duties, she escorted two convoys from NS Argentia, Newfoundland, to a rendezvous with British escorts off Greenland between 30 June and 3 September 1941. On 24 September, off Iceland, she joined the first westbound convoy to be escorted by American warships and delivered it safely to Argentia on 4 October. After United States entry into the war in December, her convoy trips were extended to the British Isles, and she remained on transatlantic convoy duty until 28 April 1942, when she entered the Boston Navy Yard for overhaul.

For nearly a year after leaving the yard in May 1942, Simpson escorted convoys up and down the United States East Coast. She made one trip to Casablanca in February 1943, and on 28 April 1943, began overhaul at the New York Navy Yard. At sea again in May, Simpson escorted a convoy from New York to Curaçao in the West Indies, and then made two round-trip voyages between Curaçao and Londonderry Port, Northern Ireland. The task group then carried out antisubmarine patrols off the Azores. The group joined a westbound convoy on 22 September but resumed antisubmarine sweeps after a submarine was reported near the Azores on 26 September. Simpson returned to the United States on 12 October but was back in the Azores conducting additional patrols between 28 October and 9 December 1943.

Resuming her convoy duties, Simpson escorted  for over three months from 29 December 1943 to 9 April 1944 as she carried troops up and down the U.S. East Coast. During the remainder of 1944 and early 1945, Simpson escorted new heavy combatant ships on shakedown and training exercises along the U.S. East Coast.

Convoys escorted

Disposal
Simpson was reclassified a miscellaneous auxiliary, AG-97, effective 23 May 1945. All her armament was removed, and she was fitted with racks for exercise torpedoes and a winch for handling towed targets. She arrived at Guantanamo Bay, Cuba, on 16 June 1945 and provided training services there for nearly a year. On 11 May 1946, the veteran ship arrived at the Philadelphia Navy Yard for inactivation. Struck from the Navy list on 19 June 1946, Simpson was sold on 21 November 1946 to Northern Metals Company, Philadelphia, for scrapping.

References

External links
http://www.navsource.org/archives/05/221.htm

Clemson-class destroyers
World War II destroyers of the United States
World War II amphibious warfare vessels of the United States
World War II auxiliary ships of the United States
Ships built by William Cramp & Sons
1920 ships